The 1964–65 UCLA Bruins men's basketball team won its second NCAA national championship under head coach John Wooden.

At Memorial Coliseum in Portland, Oregon, the #2 Bruins successfully defended their national title with a 91–80 win over top-ranked Michigan before 13,204. Gail Goodrich's 42 points and Kenny Washington's 17 points helped UCLA to become the fifth team to win consecutive championships. Wooden liked Goodrich for his "poise, quickness and speed."

After dropping the season opener at Illinois in early December, the Bruins finished the season with a 28–2 record, winning the last fifteen games and scoring a team record of 400 points in the four tournament games. Brigham Young, San Francisco, and Wichita State were also eliminated by the Bruins. This was Wooden's 17th season at UCLA.

Roster

Schedule

|-
!colspan=9 style=|Regular Season

|-
!colspan=12 style="background:#;"| NCAA Tournament

Notes
 UCLA began the season ranked first in both major polls.
 Half time score of the championship game was UCLA 47, Michigan 34.
 UCLA hit .569 of its shots, while Michigan hit .516.
 Gail Goodrich was a first team All-American

References

External links
1964–65 UCLA Bruins at Sports-Reference.com

Ucla Bruins
UCLA Bruins men's basketball seasons
NCAA Division I men's basketball tournament championship seasons
NCAA Division I men's basketball tournament Final Four seasons
Ucla
UCLA Bruins
UCLA Bruins
1965 in American sports